The 2003 All-Big Ten Conference football team consists of American football players chosen as All-Big Ten Conference players for the 2003 Big Ten Conference football season.  The conference recognizes two official All-Big Ten selectors: (1) the Big Ten conference coaches selected separate offensive and defensive units and named first- and second-team players (the "Coaches" team); and (2) a panel of sports writers and broadcasters covering the Big Ten also selected offensive and defensive units and named first- and second-team players (the "Media" team).

Offensive selections

Quarterbacks
 John Navarre, Michigan (Coaches-1; Media-1)
 Jeff Smoker, Michigan State (Coaches-2; Media-2)

Running backs
 Chris Perry, Michigan (Coaches-1; Media-1)
 Marion Barber III, Minnesota (Coaches-1; Media-1)
 Fred Russell, Iowa (Coaches-2; Media-2)
 Jason Wright, Northwestern (Coaches-2; Media-2)

Receivers
 Braylon Edwards, Michigan (Coaches-1; Media-1)
 Lee Evans, Wisconsin (Coaches-1; Media-1)
 John Standeford, Purdue (Coaches-2; Media-2)
 Jason Avant, Michigan (Coaches-2)
 Taylor Stubblefield, Purdue (Media-2)

Centers
 Greg Eslinger, Minnesota (Coaches-1; Media-1)
 Nick Hardwick, Purdue (Coaches-2)
 Dave Pearson, Michigan (Media-2)

Guards
 David Baas, Michigan (Coaches-1; Media-1)
 Alex Stepanovich, Ohio State (Coaches-1; Media-1)
 Joe Quinn, Minnesota (Coaches-2; Media-2)
 Joe Tate, Michigan State (Coaches-2)
 Dan Buenning, Wisconsin (Media-2)

Tackles
 Robert Gallery, Iowa (Coaches-1; Media-1)
 Tony Pape, Michigan (Coaches-1; Media-1)
 Shane Olivea, Ohio State (Coaches-2; Media-2)
 Steve Stewart, Michigan State (Coaches-2)
 Rian Melander, Minnesota (Media-2)

Tight ends
 Ben Utecht, Minnesota (Coaches-1; Media-2)
 Ben Hartsock, Ohio State (Coaches-2; Media-1)

Defensive selections

Defensive linemen
 Matt Roth, Iowa (Coaches-1; Media-1)
 Will Smith, Ohio State (Coaches-1; Media-1
 Shaun Phillips, Purdue (Coaches-1; Media-1)
 Tim Anderson, Ohio State (Coaches-1; Media-2)
 Anttaj Hawthorne, Wisconsin (Media-1)
 Howard Hodges, Iowa (Coaches-2; Media-2)
 Larry Stevens, Michigan (Coaches-2)
 Clifford Dukes, Michigan State (Coaches-2)
 Craig Terrill, Purdue (Coaches-2)
 Grant Bowman, Michigan (Media-2)
 Greg Taplin, Michigan State (Media-2)

Linebackers
 A. J. Hawk, Ohio State (Coaches-1; Media-1)
 Niko Koutouvides, Purdue (Coaches-1; Media-1)
 Alex Lewis, Wisconsin (Coaches-1; Media-2)
 Abdul Hodge, Iowa (Coaches-2; Media-1)
 Chad Greenway, Iowa (Coaches-2; Media-2)
 Pierre Woods, Michigan (Coaches-2)
 Gilbert Gardner, Purdue (Media-2)

Defensive backs
 Bob Sanders, Iowa (Coaches-1; Media-1)
 Stuart Schweigert, Purdue (Coaches-1; Media-1)
 Jim Leonhard, Wisconsin (Coaches-1; Media-1)
 Will Allen, Ohio State (Coaches-1; Media-2)
 Chris Gamble, Ohio State (Coaches-2; Media-1)
 Jovon Johnson, Iowa (Coaches-2)
 Jeremy LeSueur, Michigan (Coaches-2; Media-2)
 Ernest Shazor, Michigan (Coaches-2)
 Dustin Fox, Ohio State (Media-2)
 Alan Zemaitis, Penn State (Media-2)

Special teams

Kickers
 Nate Kaeding, Iowa (Coaches-1; Media-1)
 Mike Nugent, Ohio State (Coaches-2; Media-2)

Punters
 B. J. Sander, Ohio State (Coaches-1; Media-2)
 Brandon Fields, Michigan State (Coaches-2; Media-1)

Key
Bold = selected as a first-team player by both the coaches and media panel

Coaches = selected by Big Ten Conference coaches

Media = selected by a media panel

HM = Honorable mention

See also
 2003 College Football All-America Team

References

All-Big Ten Conference
All-Big Ten Conference football teams